Al Dahama is a village in Daw'an District. It is located in the Hadhramaut Governorate, According to the 2004 census it had a population of 250 people.

External links
Towns and villages in the Yemen
National Information Center in Yemen

References

Populated places in Hadhramaut Governorate
Port cities in the Arabian Peninsula
Port cities and towns of the Red Sea